Operation Bittersweet was a sting operation in the 1980s in which the U.S. Department of Justice caught companies illegally importing sugar from foreign countries in violation of the U.S. Customs Service's 1984 restrictions on the importation of sugar products. The sting resulted in 30 companies being implicated and over US$16 million in fines.

References 

Law enforcement operations in the United States
United States Department of Justice